Patrick Vroegh (born 29 November 1999) is a Dutch professional footballer who plays as a midfielder for RKC Waalwijk.

Club career
Vroegh made his Eredivisie debut for Vitesse on 19 October 2019 in a game against VVV.

In the summer of 2022, Vroegh signed a three-year contract with RKC Waalwijk.

References

External links
 
 Career stats & Profile - Voetbal International

1999 births
Living people
People from Lingewaal
Association football midfielders
Dutch footballers
SBV Vitesse players
RKC Waalwijk players
Eredivisie players
Footballers from Gelderland